Waypoint Media is a confederation of holding companies that own and operate radio and television stations mostly in small cities in the United States. Primary owners of the various companies include Mike Reed, William Christian and Paige Christian (William's wife).

History

Vision Communications and Sound Communications
Waypoint Media was originally owned by Reed. The Christians had previously operated as Vision Communications and Sound Communications (which operate television and radio stations respectively in Western New York and the Southern Tier).

In February 2014, the station announced the acquisition of the remains of Pembrook Pines Media Group, which includes the Cattaraugus County-based cluster of WMXO/WOEN in Olean and WQRS/WGGO in Salamanca. A sister company, Great Radio LLC, was to own Pembrook Pines' remaining assets in order to comply with ownership caps (such an arrangement would have left the Christians with control of most of Elmira's radio stations). Days before the sale was to close, Vision Communications and Great Radio withdrew their bid for Pembrook Pines, after a previous bidder (Randy Reid's Titan Radio) and Vision's primary competitor in both markets (Community Broadcasters, LLC) raised objections to the Christians' concentration of media ownership in the Elmira market. A revised plan submitted in August 2014 will see the Christians follow through with their purchase of the Cattaraugus County cluster while Gordy Ichikawa, who specializes in the ownership of radio broadcast towers, buys the disputed Elmira-Corning assets. The sale closed September 10, 2014. The company then bought another former Pembrook Pines station, WZKZ in Alfred, in February 2015. Pembrook Pines owner Robert Pfunter continues to own one radio station, WQRW in Wellsville.

Great Radio (controlled by Bill Christian and his son Jeffrey) continued to hold one radio station, AM station WCBA, until its license was cancelled by the Federal Communications Commission on August 11, 2022.

Merger with Waypoint Media
Mike Reed had established the original Waypoint Media in Meridian, Mississippi.

In 2018, Bill Christian partnered with Waypoint to form Star City Broadcasting to operate stations in Lafayette, Indiana. Bill Christian purchased a stake in Waypoint by 2019. It purchased the assets of the former Independent News Network in June 2019 with plans to keep INN's office in Little Rock open under the name News Hub.

Divestiture and closedown
In November 2019, Christian and Reed announced an agreement to sell all their remaining broadcast assets to Standard Media in a deal that was forecast to close following regulatory approval in early 2020. Although the acquisition by Standard Media was approved in February 2020, the consummation is on hold due to the COVID-19 pandemic and in January 2021, Waypoint filed with the FCC that the sale would not move forward. The following month, news emerged that the Christians would be exiting the upstate New York market and selling Sound Communications to Seven Mountains Media, with stations being spun off to Family Life Network to comply with FCC ownership rules. The moves, along with the concurrent shutdowns of standalone competitors WGWE and WLNL, would leave Seven Mountains as the dominant commercial broadcaster in the Southern Tier.

In July 2021, Waypoint announced the sale of all of its remaining stations to Coastal Television, stating that with increasing concentration of media ownership, small-market companies could not compete with the economics of scale provided by larger conglomerates.

Television stations

Presently-owned stations
 WBGT-CD (MyNetworkTV), Rochester, New York
 WHPM-LD (Fox), Hattiesburg, Mississippi
 WVMA-CD (Antenna TV), Winchendon, Massachusetts

Formerly-owned stations
 KJNB-LD (Fox/CBS), Jonesboro, Arkansas
 KSWL-LD (CBS), Lake Charles, Louisiana
 KWWE-LD (MyNetworkTV/MeTV), Lake Charles, Louisiana
 WGBC (Fox/NBC), Meridian, Mississippi
 WJKP-LD (MyNetworkTV), Corning, New York
 WMDN (CBS), Meridian, Mississippi
 WNBJ-LD (NBC/The CW), Jackson, Tennessee
 WPBI-LD (Fox/NBC), Lafayette, Indiana
 WPBY-LD (ABC), Lafayette, Indiana
 WVTT-CD, Olean, New York
 WYDC (Fox), Corning, New York

Radio stations

Lafayette, Indiana
WBPE
WSHY
WYCM
WAZY-FM

Corning, New York
WCBA (operated separately by Great Radio, LLC)

References

 
Radio broadcasting companies of the United States
Television broadcasting companies of the United States
Mass media in New York (state)